Jim Liddle (born 9 April 1958) is a retired Scottish professional football centre forward who played in the Scottish League for Cowdenbeath, Forfar Athletic, Meadowbank Thistle and Hamilton Academical.

Career statistics

Honours 
Forfar Athletic

 Scottish League Second Division: 1983–84

Individual

Cowdenbeath Hall of Fame

References 

Scottish footballers
Cowdenbeath F.C. players
Scottish Football League players
Association football forwards
Forfar Athletic F.C. players
1958 births
Hamilton Academical F.C. players
Livingston F.C. players
Scottish expatriate footballers
Scottish expatriate sportspeople in Belgium
Expatriate footballers in Belgium
Footballers from Edinburgh
Living people